Peribasis helenor is a species of beetle in the family Cerambycidae. It was described by Newman in 1851, originally under the genus Monohammus. It is known from Malaysia, India, and Sumatra.

References

Lamiini
Beetles described in 1851